Oswald Robinson Snowball (18 July 1859 – 16 March 1928) was an English-born Australian politician.

Snowball was born in Wolsingham, England, and arrived in Australia in 1868 where his family spent three years on the land. He studied at Carlton College and the University of Melbourne where he qualified as a solicitor and was admitted to practice in 1883. He was a partner in the firms Briggs & Snowball and later Snowball & Kaufmann.

Snowball was elected to the Victorian parliament representing the Commonwealth Liberal Party in the seat of Brighton in a by-election on 8 October 1909. 
He was a prominent advocate of divorce law reform, in which he was supported by Rev. William Bottomley and the Melbourne Unitarian Church.
He served on various royal commissions, until he was voted Speaker of the Victorian Legislative Assembly at the commencement of the 29th Parliament on 6 July 1927.
Snowball died in office on 16 March the next year.

References

1859 births
1928 deaths
Speakers of the Victorian Legislative Assembly
Members of the Victorian Legislative Assembly
Australian solicitors
Melbourne Law School alumni
English emigrants to Australia
People from Wolsingham